Joachim Fischer Nielsen (born 23 November 1978) is a Danish retired badminton player. At the 2012 Summer Olympics, he won the bronze medal in the mixed doubles with teammate Christinna Pedersen. He retired from the international tournament in the end of 2018.

Fischer Nielsen was named Badminton Denmark 2011 Player of the Year together with his partner in the mixed doubles Christinna Pedersen. He was later received Badminton Denmark's merit.

Achievements

Olympic Games 
Mixed doubles

BWF World Championships 
Mixed doubles

European Championships 
Mixed doubles

BWF Superseries 
The BWF Superseries, which was launched on 14 December 2006 and implemented in 2007, was a series of elite badminton tournaments, sanctioned by the Badminton World Federation (BWF). BWF Superseries levels were Superseries and Superseries Premier. A season of Superseries consisted of twelve tournaments around the world that had been introduced since 2011. Successful players were invited to the Superseries Finals, which were held at the end of each year.

Mixed doubles

  BWF Superseries Finals tournament
  BWF Superseries Premier tournament
  BWF Superseries tournament

BWF Grand Prix 
The BWF Grand Prix had two levels, the Grand Prix and Grand Prix Gold. It was a series of badminton tournaments sanctioned by the Badminton World Federation (BWF) and played between 2007 and 2017. The World Badminton Grand Prix was sanctioned by the International Badminton Federation from 1983 to 2006.

Men's doubles

Mixed doubles

 BWF Grand Prix Gold tournament
 BWF & IBF Grand Prix tournament

BWF/IBF International Challenge/Series 
Men's singles

Men's doubles

Mixed doubles

  BWF International Challenge tournament
  BWF International Series tournament

References

External links 
 
 
 

1978 births
Living people
People from Gentofte Municipality
Sportspeople from Copenhagen
Danish male badminton players
Olympic badminton players of Denmark
Olympic bronze medalists for Denmark
Olympic medalists in badminton
Badminton players at the 2012 Summer Olympics
Badminton players at the 2016 Summer Olympics
Medalists at the 2012 Summer Olympics
World No. 1 badminton players